Richard Kilby (Kilbye) (1560–1620) was an English scholar and priest.

Life

He was born in Ratcliffe-on-the-Wreake, Leicestershire. He matriculated at Lincoln College, Oxford on 20 December 1577, and was elected fellow on 18 January 1578. He was admitted B.A. on 9 December 1578, M.A. in 1582, B.D. and D.D. in 1596. On 10 December 1590 he was elected rector of Lincoln College. He was appointed Regius Professor of Hebrew in 1610, and served in the "First Oxford Company" charged by James I of England with translating the latter part of the Old Testament for the King James Version of the Bible.

Works

He published a funeral sermon on Thomas Holland, in 1613, and also a volume of commentary on the Book of Exodus, drawn from earlier Hebrew rabbinical studies. His continuation of John Mercer's commentary on Genesis was submitted for approval (1598), but he was not allowed to print it.

References
McClure, Alexander. (1858) The Translators Revived: A Biographical Memoir of the Authors of the English Version of the Holy Bible. Mobile, Alabama: R. E. Publications (republished by the Marantha Bible Society, 1984 ASIN B0006YJPI8 )
Nicolson, Adam. (2003) God's Secretaries: The Making of the King James Bible. New York: HarperCollins

Notes

Attribution

1560 births
1620 deaths
Alumni of Lincoln College, Oxford
Fellows of Lincoln College, Oxford
Translators of the King James Version
People from the Borough of Charnwood
16th-century English Anglican priests
17th-century English Anglican priests
16th-century translators
17th-century translators
Rectors of Lincoln College, Oxford
Regius Professors of Hebrew (University of Oxford)
17th-century Anglican theologians
16th-century Anglican theologians